Ryan Peter Hedges (born 8 July 1995) is a Welsh professional footballer who plays for Blackburn Rovers and the Wales national football team. 

He made his professional debut for Leyton Orient in January 2015, on loan from Swansea City. After further loan spells at Stevenage and Yeovil Town, Hedges signed permanently for Barnsley in 2017. He joined Scottish Premiership club Aberdeen in June 2019 and later signed for EFL Championship club Blackburn Rovers in January 2022.

Early life
Hedges attended Hawarden High School in Hawarden, Flintshire, North Wales. Michael Owen, Andy Dorman, Gary Speed and Danny Ward are fellow ex-pupils from the school who became professional footballers. Hedges spent seven seasons at Everton as a schoolboy, eventually being released at under-16 level.

Professional career

Swansea City

Hedges joined Swansea City from Flint Town in July 2013 following some impressive performances for the Welsh Schools Under-18 team. Hedges linked up with the Swansea City Under-21 team in the 2013–14 season, and was rewarded for his progress with a new one-year contract until June 2014.

In June 2015, Hedges signed a three-year contract extension at Swansea.

Leyton Orient loan

On 16 January 2015, Hedges joined League One team Leyton Orient on a one-month loan deal. He made his professional debut for Leyton Orient against Colchester United on 24 January 2015. After an impressive start, Hedges' loan was extended until the end of the 2014–15 season. Hedges scored his first professional goal for Leyton Orient, and then set up a goal for Chris Dagnall, in a 2–0 win over Walsall on 28 February 2015. Weeks later on 14 March 2015, Hedges scored his second goal for Leyton Orient in a 3–0 win over Yeovil Town. Hedges went on to make seventeen appearances, scoring twice, as Orient were relegated to League Two.

Stevenage loan

In February 2016, Hedges joined Stevenage on a one-month emergency loan.

Yeovil Town loan

On 8 July 2016, Hedges signed for League Two side Yeovil Town on a six-month loan deal.

Barnsley

On 31 January 2017, Hedges was recalled from his loan spell at Yeovil, and signed permanently for EFL Championship side Barnsley for an undisclosed fee on a two-and-a-half-year contract. He scored his first goal for Barnsley in a 3–1 loss at Bristol City on 5 August 2017.

Aberdeen

Hedges was offered a new contract by Barnsley at the end of the 2018–19 season, but he instead opted to sign a three-year contract with Scottish Premiership club Aberdeen. On 27 August 2020, he scored a hat-trick as Aberdeen won 6–0 at home against NSÍ Runavík in the Europa League first qualifying round, having only come on as a half-time substitute.

Blackburn Rovers

On 30 January 2022, Hedges joined Blackburn Rovers on a three-and-a-half year deal, with an optional 12 month extension, for an undisclosed fee. He scored his first goal for the club on 13 September in a 2–0 win against Watford.

International career
Prior to joining Swansea City, Hedges scored twice and claimed an assist as captain of the Welsh Schools Under-18s team in a 4–1 win over England. Hedges has represented Wales at under-19 and under-21 level.

He made his debut for the senior side on 14 November 2017 as a substitute during a 1–1 draw with Panama.

Career statistics

Honours

Club
Barnsley
EFL League One runner-up: 2018–19

References

External links
 
 
 
 Swansea City A.F.C. profile

1995 births
Living people
Association football wingers
Association football forwards
Welsh footballers
Wales youth international footballers
Wales under-21 international footballers
English footballers
English people of Welsh descent
Flint Town United F.C. players
Swansea City A.F.C. players
Leyton Orient F.C. players
Stevenage F.C. players
Yeovil Town F.C. players
Barnsley F.C. players
Aberdeen F.C. players
Blackburn Rovers F.C. players
English Football League players
Scottish Professional Football League players
Wales international footballers